Zaymishche is a rural locality (a village) in Baydarovskoye Rural Settlement, Nikolsky District, Vologda Oblast, Russia. The population was 27 as of 2002.

Geography 
The distance to Nikolsk is 27 km, to Baydarovo is 8 km. Kumbiser is the nearest rural locality.

References 

Rural localities in Nikolsky District, Vologda Oblast